Alger County is a county in the Upper Peninsula of the U.S. state of Michigan. As of the 2020 Census, the population was 8,842. Its county seat is Munising. The Pictured Rocks National Lakeshore is located within the county.

History
Alger County was detached from Schoolcraft County, set off and organized in 1885.
The county was named for lumber baron Russell Alexander Alger, who was elected as a Michigan Governor, and US Senator, and appointed as US Secretary of War during the William McKinley Presidential administration. See also, List of Michigan county name etymologies, List of Michigan counties, and List of abolished U.S. counties.

Geography

It is the second-largest county in Michigan by total area, mainly because of Lake Superior on the north side of the county.

Highways

 
 
 
 
 
 
 
 
 
 
 
 
 
 , passes through Pictured Rocks National Lakeshore.

Adjacent counties
 Luce County – east
 Schoolcraft County – southeast
 Delta County – south
 Marquette County – west
 Thunder Bay District, Ontario – north

National protected areas

 Grand Island National Recreation Area
 Hiawatha National Forest (part)
 Pictured Rocks National Lakeshore

Demographics

The 2010 United States Census indicates Alger County had a population of 9,601. This decrease of 261 people from the 2000 United States Census represents a 2.6% population decrease. In 2010 there were 3,898 households and 2,479 families residing in the county. There were 6,554 housing units at an average density of 7 per square mile (3/km2). The racial makeup of the county was 86.3% White, 6.4% Black or African American, 4.1% Native American, 0.3% Asian, 0.1% of some other race and 2.7% of two or more races. 1.2% were Hispanic or Latino (of any race).

Regarding specific ethnicities, 15.7% of the population was of German heritage, 13.5% Finnish, 12.6% French, French Canadian or Cajun, 9.3% English, 7.3% Polish, 6.9% Irish and 5.3% American ancestry.

There were 3,898 households, out of which 20.1% had children under the age of 18 living with them, 52.2% were married couples living together, 7.1% had a female householder with no husband present, and 36.4% were non-families. 31.6% of all households were made up of individuals, and 15.2% had someone living alone who was 65 years of age or older. The average household size was 2.2 and the average family size was 2.74.

In the county, the population was spread out, with 17.1% under the age of 18, 6.6% from 18 to 24, 22.8% from 25 to 44, 32.8% from 45 to 64, and 20.7% who were 65 years of age or older. The median age was 47.3 years. The population was 54.4% male and 45.6% female.

The median income for a household in the county was $38,231, and the median income for a family was $46,154. The per capita income for the county was $19,858. About 9.3% of people in families and 14.0% of the population were below the poverty line, including 19.3% of those under age 18 and 8.2% of those age 65 or over.

Government
The county government operates the jail, maintains rural roads, operates local courts, records deeds, mortgages, and vital records, administers public health regulations, and participates with the state in the provision of welfare and other social services. The county board of commissioners controls the budget and has limited authority to make laws or ordinances. In Michigan, most local government functions — police and fire, building and zoning, tax assessment, street maintenance, etc. — are the responsibility of individual cities and townships.

Communities

City
 Munising (county seat)

Village
 Chatham

Civil townships

 Au Train Township
 Burt Township
 Grand Island Township
 Limestone Township
 Mathias Township
 Munising Township
 Onota Township
 Rock River Township

Unincorporated communities

 Au Train
 Christmas
 Coalwood
 Deerton
 Diffin
 Dixon
 Dorsey
 Doty
 Eben Junction
 Evelyn
 Forest Lake
 Grand Marais
 Green Haven
 Indian Town
 Juniper
 Kentucky
 Kiva
 Ladoga
 Limestone
 Mantila Camp
 Melstrand
 Munising Junction
 Myren
 Onota
 Rock River
 Rumely
 Sand River
 Shingleton
 Slapneck
 Star
 Stillman
 Sullivans Landing
 Sundell
 Sunrise Landing
 Traunik
 Trenary
 Vail
 Van Meer
 Wetmore
 Williams Crossing
 Williams Landing
 Winters

Indian reservations
 Alger County contains two very small portions of the Sault Tribe of Chippewa Indians tribal community, which is headquartered in Sault Ste. Marie in Chippewa County.  One portion is in the northeastern corner of Au Train Township, and another slightly larger portion is about two miles south of Munising in Munising Township.

Politics
Alger County was reliably Republican from the beginning through 1928. Since then it has voted for the Democratic nominee 65% (15 of 23) of the time.

See also
 List of Michigan State Historic Sites in Alger County, Michigan
 National Register of Historic Places listings in Alger County, Michigan

References

External links
 Alger County Online
 Greater Munising Bay Partnership for Commerce Development & Alger County Chamber
 County Profile, Sam M Cohodas Regional Economist, Tawni Hunt Ferrarini, Ph.D.
 National Association of Counties - Alger County, MI
 Alger County Sheriff's Office
 US Coast Guard Auxiliary Flotilla 26-12
 

 
Michigan counties
Populated places established in 1885
1885 establishments in Michigan